Y Lyncis is a semiregular variable star in the constellation Lynx. It is an asymptotic giant branch star of spectral type M6S, with a luminosity class of Ib, indicating a supergiant luminosity. It is around 800 light years away.

Y Lyncis ranges in brightness from magnitude 6.8 to 8.9. Its changes in brightness are complex with at least two different periods showing.  The General Catalogue of Variable Stars lists a period of 110 days.  More recent studies show a primary pulsation period of 133 days, with and a long secondary period with an amplitude of 0.2 magnitudes and duration 1,300 days.  The long secondary period variations are possibly caused by long-lived convection cells.

It is a thermally pulsing asymptotic giant branch star, an evolved star with a carbon-oxygen core that is fusing helium in a shell and hydrogen in a separate shell. It is also an S-type star, where third dredge-ups have brought some carbon to the surface, but not enough to create a carbon star.

References 

Lynx (constellation)
Semiregular variable stars
036288
058521
S-type stars
Lyncis, Y
Durchmusterung objects